Francesco Ferrari (born 5 September 1998) is an Italian football player. He plays for the youth squad of SPAL.

Club career
He made his Serie C debut for Pontedera on 28 January 2018 in a game against Arzachena.

References

External links
 

1998 births
Footballers from Rome
Living people
Italian footballers
Association football defenders
S.P.A.L. players
U.S. Città di Pontedera players
Serie C players